Niagara Motel is a 2006 Canadian drama film directed by Gary Yates. It was adapted by George F. Walker from Suburban Motel his series of six plays. The film earned numerous nominations, including a Genie Award for Best Supporting Actress for Caroline Dhavernas.

Plot 
Niagara Motel features its namesake and the ongoings amongst the inhabitants of the motel and linked Riverside Grill coffee shop located in Niagara Falls. The characters include the owner and his daughter (Andrei and Fitch), their newly pregnant waitress (Dhavernas) being recruited to star in low budget porn videos, a young couple (Friel and Holden-Reid) with a criminal past struggling to recover their child from social services, and a middle class husband and wife (Keleghan and Crewson) in a marriage that is disintegrating in near-record time - all led by a drunken motel caretaker (Ferguson).

Cast  
 Craig Ferguson as Phillie, The Motel Caretaker
 Peter Keleghan as Henry
 Damir Andrei as Boris, The Motel Owner
 Wendy Crewson as Lily
 Anna Friel as Denise
 Kristen Holden-Ried as R.J.
 Kevin Pollak as Michael
 Caroline Dhavernas as Loretta
 Catherine Fitch as Sophie
 Tom Barnett as Dave
 Pierre Collin as Claude

Locations 
While some scenes were filmed in Niagara Falls, Ontario, most of the film was filmed in and around Winnipeg, Manitoba.  The motel scenes were filmed in Steinbach.  Additional scenes were filmed in Lockport and Selkirk, where the real Riverside Grill stood until 2012.

Reception 

 
Rotten Tomatoes gave the film an approval rating of 36% based on 14 reviews, with an average rating of 5.00/10.

References

External links 
 , official website
 
 
 
 

2006 films
2006 drama films
English-language Canadian films
Films based on Canadian plays
Films shot in Winnipeg
Films directed by Gary Yates
Canadian drama films
2000s English-language films
2000s Canadian films